Alexandra Niepel (born 24 August 1970) is a British former professional tennis player.

Niepel competed on the professional tour from 1987 to 1990.

At the 1988 Wimbledon Championships, she and Sally Godman received a wildcard to play in the women's doubles main draw, where they lost their first round match to the eighth seeds Katrina Adams and Zina Garrison.

Following her touring career she played college tennis in the United States for Mississippi State University.

ITF finals

Singles: 1 (0–1)

Doubles: 10 (3–7)

References

External links
 
 

1970 births
Living people
British female tennis players
Mississippi State Bulldogs athletes
College women's tennis players in the United States